Ek Sereywath (born 1954) is a retired Cambodian ambassador.

Career
In 1970 he left Cambodia and spent the Khmer Rouge years in Paris.
From 1978 to 1980 he was journalist for Le Figaro.
From 1983 to 1985 he was editor of a newsletter at the Cambodian center in Paris.
From 1985 to 1993 he represented the Cambodian royalist party as deputy director and then as director at the FUNCINPEC Information Office.
In 1993, Ek was elected to the National Assembly of Cambodia where he was five years representative 
For six months in 1993 he was vice minister at the Ministry of Information.
From 1993 to 1996 he was vice minister at the Ministry of National Defense.
From 1999 to 2003 he was ambassador in Manila (Philippines).
In 2004, Ek held a seat in the Cambodian Senate.

References

1954 births
Members of the National Assembly (Cambodia)
Members of the Senate (Cambodia)
Ambassadors of Cambodia to the Philippines
Ambassadors of Cambodia to the United States
Living people